The 1979 Bordeaux Open also known as the Grand Prix Passing Shot was a men's tennis tournament played on outdoor clay courts at Villa Primrose in Bordeaux, France that was part of the 1979 Colgate-Palmolive Grand Prix. The tournament was held from 1 October until 7 October 1979. Singles matches were best of five sets and doubles best of three. Fourth-seeded Yannick Noah won the singles title.

Finals

Singles
 Yannick Noah defeated  Harold Solomon 6–0, 6–7, 6–1, 1–6, 6–4
 It was Noah's 3rd singles title of the year and the 5th of his career.

Doubles
 Patrice Dominguez /  Denis Naegelen defeated  Bernard Fritz /  Iván Molina 6–4, 6–4

References

External links
 ITF tournament edition details

Bordeaux Open
ATP Bordeaux
Bordeaux Open
1979 in French tennis